Joseph Walton (born 1830, date of death unknown) was a convict transported to Western Australia. The son of a watchmaker, Walton was born in Canada, but it was in England on 19 July 1851 that he was convicted of burglary and sentenced to ten years' penal servitude.  Walton was transported to Western Australia on Dudbrook, arriving in February 1853. After obtaining his ticket of leave, he worked as a carpenter.  He received his conditional pardon in July 1856, and the following month he married Fanny Kenney. Over the next few years he worked in the Avon and Greenough districts; his wife did not accompany him and the fact that he was married was not known.  Walton took up land at Greenough, and built a hotel there. Later he won a number of contracts to build government buildings, including a one-room school, a police station and a courthouse.

In the late 1860s and early 1870s Greenough suffered severely from flood, bushfire, wheat rust and sheep scab. Correctly anticipating a recession, Walton sold his hotel in 1872, and purchased a small coastal trading boat, Alexandra. In December the following year, he married Georgina Roe, daughter of James Elphinstone Roe. The couple then sailed for Singapore, where they had a son.  Eventually Georgina Roe discovered her husband's bigamy, and in 1876 Walton left Singapore for Hong Kong. He did not return.

References

1830 births
19th-century Canadian criminals
Convicts transported to Western Australia
People convicted of burglary
Recipients of British royal pardons
Year of death missing
Canadian emigrants to Australia